Murli Halt railway station is a halt railway station on the branch of Sahibganj loop line under the Malda railway division of Eastern Railway zone. It is situated beside Tin Pahar-Rajmahal Road at Mahadevpur in Sahebganj district in the Indian state of Jharkhand.

References

Railway stations in Sahibganj district
Malda railway division